Inés Herrera Fernández is a Spanish football goalkeeper, currently playing for Sevilla FC in Segunda División.

She played in Primera División with Sevilla and Levante UD, with whom she won the 2004 Copa de la Reina.

References

1978 births
Living people
Spanish women's footballers
Primera División (women) players
Levante UD Femenino players
Women's association football goalkeepers
21st-century Spanish women